is a Japanese manga series written and illustrated by Ryōma Kitada. It was serialized in Shueisha's Jump Square magazine from May 2017 to February 2021, with its chapters collected into twelve tankōbon volumes. In North America, the manga is licensed by Seven Seas Entertainment. A 12-episode anime television series adaptation produced by Project No.9 aired from July to September 2020.

Premise
An unknown type of alien called  invades Earth. They plunder "H-energy" in an attempt to make mankind extinct. To save the Earth from the alien threat, high school boy Retto Enjō joins the "HxEros" team, partnering with four beautiful high school girls, one of whom is his childhood friend Kirara Hoshino. However, it turns out that Kirara has drastically changed her personality, which leads to an estrangement between the two childhood friends.

Characters

Main

A second year high school student who lives in Saitama. He joined HxEros at the recommendation of his uncle after his childhood friend, Kirara Hoshino, was attacked by a Censor Bug when they were children. Despite the rift between them following the Censor Bug attack, he continues to have feelings for her. At the end of the series, he confesses to Kirara and they become a couple.

Kirara is Retto's childhood friend. Once having an outgoing personality when she was younger, Kirara changed after she was attacked by a Censor Bug, to the point she avoids boys in general. Despite that, she retains feelings for Retto.

An energetic and athletic girl, Momoka joined HxEros thanks to her rivalry with her older sister, who is a model. It is hinted that she has feelings for Retto.

Sora is a ditz who occasionally wanders into Retto's bed when she is half asleep. She likes to draw erotic manga. She is a classmate of Retto's younger sister, Hiiro.

Maihime is a friendly girl who believes she does not have any special abilities. Unbeknownst to her, however, her H-energy is a lot stronger than she thinks. She goes to an all-girls school.

Supporting

Retto's uncle, Jō works for the Earth Defense Force Saitama Branch as the Chief of the Hero Section. 

A Censor Bug who is the oldest child of the queen. Unlike other members of her species, Chacha is able to release pheromones that make it easier for others to feel H-energy. As such, she is despised and imprisoned by her species.

A puppy who lives at Retto's house. 

A member of HxEros who works for the Tokyo Branch. Thanks to her XERO gear, she has a very insensitive body. She developed a crush on Retto after he helped her release her H-energy while he was in beast mode.

A member of HxEros who works for the Tokyo Branch. She went to the same middle school as Momoka.

A member of HxEros who works for the Tokyo Branch. A fan of Retto, he has an effeminate appearance.

A member of HxEros who works for the Tokyo Branch. She comes across as being mature.

Retto's younger sister. She is a classmate of Sora.

Media

Manga
Super HxEros, written and illustrated by Ryōma Kitada, was serialized in Shueisha's Jump Square magazine from May 2, 2017 to February 4, 2021. Kitada announced that the series will continue in some form in the future. Shueisha collected its chapters in twelve individual tankōbon volumes, which were released from September 4, 2017 to March 4, 2021. In North America, the manga is licensed by Seven Seas Entertainment.

Volume list

Anime
An anime television series adaptation was announced on October 25, 2019. The series was animated by Project No.9, written and directed by Masato Jinbo, with Akitomo Yamamoto designing the characters, and Gin from music group BUSTED ROSE composing the music. It aired from July 4 to September 26, 2020 on Tokyo MX and other channels. The opening theme, "Wake Up Hx ERO!", was performed by the rock band Burnout Syndromes, performing as HxEros Syndromes, featuring Yoshitsugu Matsuoka performing as his character, Retto Enjō. The ending theme, "Lost emotion", was performed by Ai Kakuma as her character, Kirara Hoshino. The series ran for 12 episodes. An OVA is bundled with the manga's eleventh volume, which was released on November 4, 2020. Another OVA is bundled with the manga's twelfth and final volume, which was released on March 4, 2021. 

The series is licensed by Aniplex of America. Funimation streamed the censored broadcast version on its platform. On September 4, 2020, Funimation announced that the series would receive an English dub, which premiered on the same day. Following Sony's acquisition of Crunchyroll, the series was moved to Crunchyroll.

Episode list

OVAs

Reception
As of October 2019, the manga had 900,000 copies in circulation. Nicholas Dupree of Anime News Network called the series a "good-vs-evil superpowered girls show," while fellow reviewer, Monique Thomas called it a "horny Super Sentai parody show." Dupree also praised the series for being more in-depth than what they expected, but Thomas criticized it for, at times, its "sex positive fanservice" falling flat. Both reviewers pointed out that Maihime has a "lesbian prince girlfriend," noting it is not the only lesbian relationship in the series, as one of Kirara's friends, not part of the Super HxEros, is "dating an older girl."

Notes

References

External links
Manga official website 
Anime official website 
Official North American anime website

2020 anime television series debuts
Action anime and manga
Alien invasions in fiction
Anime series based on manga
Aniplex
Censored television series
Comedy anime and manga
Crunchyroll anime
Ecchi anime and manga
Extraterrestrials in anime and manga
Harem anime and manga
Project No.9
Seven Seas Entertainment titles
Shōnen manga
Shueisha manga
Superheroes in anime and manga
Tokyo MX original programming